PB-16 Jafarabad is a constituency of the Provincial Assembly of Balochistan.

General elections 2013

General elections 2008

See also
 PB-15 Sohbatpur
 PB-17 Jafarabad-cum-Usta Muhammad

References

External links
 Election commission Pakistan's official website
 Awazoday.com check result
 Balochistan's Assembly official site

Constituencies of Balochistan